Malaysia competed at the 2019 Winter Universiade in Krasnoyarsk, Russia. The Malaysia only had a sole competitor in figure skating.

Figure skating

Singles

See also
Malaysia at the 2019 Summer Universiade

References

Winter Universidade
2019 Winter Universiade
Nations at the 2019 Winter Universiade